Quinsy may refer to:

Quinsy, California; renamed Quincy, California
Quinsy, a name for peritonsillar abscess
Quinsy Gario (born 1984), Dutch anti-racist campaigner

See also
Quincy (disambiguation)
Quinsey (disambiguation)